HD 60532 c is an extrasolar planet located approximately 84 light-years away in the constellation of Puppis, orbiting the star HD 60532. This planet has a true mass of 7.46 times more than Jupiter, orbits at 1.58 AU, and takes 607 days to revolve in an eccentric orbit. This planet was discovered on September 22, 2008 in La Silla Observatory using the HARPS spectrograph. On this same day, the second planet in this system, HD 60532 b, was discovered in a 3:1 orbital resonance.

References

External links
 

Exoplanets discovered in 2008
Giant planets
Puppis
Exoplanets detected by radial velocity